Maher is an unincorporated community located in Montrose County, Colorado, United States.  The U.S. Post Office at Crawford (ZIP Code 81415) now serves Maher postal addresses.

Geography
Maher is located at  (38.646104,-107.585163).

References

Unincorporated communities in Montrose County, Colorado
Unincorporated communities in Colorado